Álvaro Rey Vázquez (born 11 July 1989) is a Spanish professional footballer who plays as a winger for Deportivo de La Coruña.

Club career
Rey was born in Seville, Andalusia. In the summer of 2010, after playing with both Real Betis' reserve teams, he signed for Gimnàstic de Tarragona in Segunda División. He made his official debut on 31 October, featuring five minutes in a 1–1 home draw against Córdoba CF, and spent the vast majority of his first professional season switching between Gimnàstic and its farm team, CF Pobla de Mafumet.

On 4 December 2010, Rey started for Nàstic for the first time, in a 1–2 home defeat to Villarreal CF B. He scored his first goal for the Catalans on 21 January 2012, the only in the home match against Elche CF, but they eventually suffered relegation.

After two seasons with Gimnàstic, Rey was released. On 17 July 2012, he joined Xerez CD on a two-year contract.

The club dropped two levels at the end of the 2012–13 campaign due to financial irregularities, and subsequently Rey went on trial with Toronto FC of the Major League Soccer, appearing in a reserve team match and agreeing to a deal on 25 July 2013. He scored his first goal for his new club on 28 September, in a 4–1 win over D.C. United.

On 6 June 2014, Rey was traded to Columbus Crew for Dominic Oduro. His contract was terminated by mutual consent on 15 July, after alleging personal reasons, and he signed with AD Alcorcón later the same day.

On 14 February 2017, Rey agreed to a six-month contract at Super League Greece side Panetolikos FC. On 16 July, he moved to the Polish Ekstraklasa with Arka Gdynia.

Career statistics

References

External links

Beticopedia profile 

1989 births
Living people
Footballers from Seville
Spanish footballers
Association football wingers
Segunda División players
Segunda División B players
Tercera División players
Betis Deportivo Balompié footballers
CF Pobla de Mafumet footballers
Gimnàstic de Tarragona footballers
Xerez CD footballers
AD Alcorcón footballers
Real Murcia players
Racing de Ferrol footballers
CD Mirandés footballers
Deportivo de La Coruña players
Major League Soccer players
Toronto FC players
Columbus Crew players
Super League Greece players
Panetolikos F.C. players
Ekstraklasa players
Arka Gdynia players
Bolivian Primera División players
Club Bolívar players
Spanish expatriate footballers
Expatriate soccer players in Canada
Expatriate soccer players in the United States
Expatriate footballers in Greece
Expatriate footballers in Poland
Expatriate footballers in Bolivia
Spanish expatriate sportspeople in Canada
Spanish expatriate sportspeople in the United States
Spanish expatriate sportspeople in Greece
Spanish expatriate sportspeople in Poland
Spanish expatriate sportspeople in Bolivia